Quartino is a small village in Magadino, Ticino, Switzerland.

References

Villages in Ticino